Bilady , also spelled biladi or beladi, is Arabic for "my country". It is the title of several national anthems and other patriotic songs:

"Bilady, Bilady, Bilady", also known as "Bilādī, laki Ḥubbī wa Fūʾādī", the Egyptian national anthem
"Ishy Bilady", the national anthem of the United Arab Emirates
"Biladi Manar al-Huda" (بلادي منار الهدى), a Saudi Arabian patriotic song with lyrics by the Lebanese poet Said Fayad and music by Siraj Omar

See also
Balady (disambiguation)